Belagavi Rural Assembly Seat is one of 224 assembly constituencies in Karnataka state, in India. It is one of the 8 constituencies which make up Belagavi (Lok Sabha constituency). The constituency came into existence when the assembly map was redrawn in 2008. Prior to that most of its area was under the now defunct Uchagaon.

Members of Assembly
 1967-2004 : See Belagavi Assembly constituency, Bagewadi Assembly constituency, Uchagaon Assembly constituency
 2008: Sanjay Patil (BJP)
 2013: Sanjay Patil (BJP)

Election results

2008 Election 
 Sanjay B Patil (BJP) : 42,208 votes  
 Malagi Shivaputrappa Chanabasappa (INC) : 33,899

2013 Election 
 Sanjay B Patil (BJP) : 38,322 votes  
 Kinekar Manohar Kallappa (IND / MES) : 36,987 votes 
 Laxmi Hebbalkar, Congress, in third position

2018 Election 
 Laxmi Hebbalkar (INC) : 102,040 votes  
 Sanjay B Patil (BJP) : 50,316

See also 
 Belagavi District
 List of constituencies of Karnataka Legislative Assembly

References

Assembly constituencies of Karnataka